Interneurons (also called internuncial neurons, relay neurons, association neurons, connector neurons, intermediate neurons or local circuit neurons) are neurons that connect to brain regions, i.e. not direct motor neurons or sensory neurons. Interneurons are the central nodes of neural circuits, enabling communication between sensory or motor neurons and the central nervous system (CNS). They play vital roles in reflexes, neuronal oscillations, and neurogenesis in the adult mammalian brain.

Interneurons can be further broken down into two groups: local interneurons and relay interneurons. Local interneurons have short axons and form circuits with nearby neurons to analyze small pieces of information. Relay interneurons have long axons and connect circuits of neurons in one region of the brain with those in other regions. However, interneurons are generally considered to operate mainly within local brain areas. The interaction between interneurons allow the brain to perform complex functions such as learning, and decision-making.

Structure
Approximately 20–30% of the neurons in the neocortex are interneurons, while the remaining neurons are pyramidal neurons.  Investigations into the molecular diversity of neurons is impeded by the inability to isolate cell populations born at different times for gene expression analysis. An effective means of identifying coetaneous interneurons is neuronal birthdating. This can be achieved using nucleoside analogs such as EdU.

In 2008, a nomenclature for the features of GABAergic cortical interneurons was proposed, called Petilla terminology.

Spinal cord 
  Ia inhibitory interneuron: Found in lamina VII.  Responsible for inhibiting antagonist motor neuron.  1a spindle afferents activate 1a inhibitory neuron.
  Ib inhibitory interneuron: Found in lamina V, VI, VII. Afferent or Golgi tendon organ activates it.

Cortex 
  Parvalbumin-expressing interneurons
  CCK-expressing interneurons
  VIP-expressing interneurons
  SOM-expressing interneurons

Cerebellum 
  Molecular layer (basket cells, stellate cells)
  Golgi cells
  Granule cells
  Lugaro cells
  Unipolar brush cells

Striatum
Parvalbumin-expressing interneurons
Cholinergic interneurons
Tyrosine hydroxylase-expressing interneurons
Calretinin-expressing interneurons
Nitric oxide synthase-expressing interneurons

Function
Interneurons in the CNS are primarily inhibitory, and use the neurotransmitter GABA or glycine. However, excitatory interneurons using glutamate in the CNS also exist, as do interneurons releasing neuromodulators like acetylcholine. Interneurons main function is to provide a neural circuit, conducting flow of signals or information between a sensory neuron and or motor neuron.

See also 
 Relay (disambiguation)

References 

Neurons